Barbershop: The Next Cut (also known as Barbershop 3 or Barbershop 3: The Next Cut) is a 2016 American comedy film directed by Malcolm D. Lee, written by Kenya Barris and Tracy Oliver and produced by Ice Cube, Robert Teitel and George Tillman Jr. It is the sequel to 2004's Barbershop 2: Back in Business and the third mainline installment in the Barbershop film series. It stars an ensemble cast, including returning actors Cube, Cedric the Entertainer, Anthony Anderson, Eve, Sean Patrick Thomas, and Deon Cole  and new cast members Regina Hall, J. B. Smoove, Lamorne Morris, Tyga, Common, and Nicki Minaj. This is the first film in the series that Michael Ealy and Leonard Earl Howze did not reprise their roles as Ricky and Dinka respectively.

The project was announced in March 2014, and Lee was hired to direct the film in February 2015. Principal photography began in Atlanta, Georgia in May 2015 with some aerial shots filmed in Chicago, Illinois.

Barbershop: The Next Cut was released on April 15, 2016 by Warner Bros. Pictures. It received positive reviews from critics, with praise directed at the performances of the cast, Lee's direction, and the screenplay. It was a moderate box office success, grossing $55 million worldwide on a $20 million production budget.

Plot

Calvin (Ice Cube) expresses his love for the city of Chicago for being his hometown and the place where he has been running his barbershop business and supporting his family. Unfortunately, the city has been plagued by gang violence and criminal activity as of late, and tensions have begun to rise, especially in Calvin's neighborhood.

Eddie (Cedric The Entertainer) comes running into the barbershop frightened because he claims to have made a comment at some thugs over their pants sagging. Eddie gets Calvin panicked as the door starts banging, but it's really just a delivery man bringing Eddie his breakfast, to Calvin's annoyance.

The barbershop is now co-run by Calvin and Angie (Regina Hall), allowing a separate section for women to work, with new recruits Bree (Margot Bingham) and Draya (Nicki Minaj). On the men's side are Jerrod (Lamorne Morris), Raja (Utkarsh Ambudkar), and Rashad (Common), new husband of Terri (Eve). Isaac (Troy Garity) and Jimmy (Sean Patrick Thomas) no longer work there, but still keep in touch as customers. JD (Anthony Anderson), the estranged cousin of former barber Ricky, has given up a life of crime and now runs a food truck business.

However, he openly lies about what he does with the proceeds - claiming that he donates the money to charity but in truth, he and his overbearing grandmother (Auntie Fee) keep the money for themselves. The shop also has a boy named Anthony Clark (Torion Sellers) working there while he puts his focus on school. Rashad's son Kenny (Diallo Thompson) has been hanging out with Calvin's son Jalen (Michael Rainey, Jr.). The boys come in one morning before school, and Calvin catches Kenny trying to swipe two Snickers bars.

Outside, some Gangster Disciples pull up and try to steal the boys' shoes, until the Vice Lords of that area come outside and tell the other gang to step off. The Vice Lords leader, Yummy (Tyga) is friendly with the boys based on the assumption that they are willing to join his gang.

The men and women of the barbershop converse on the subject of modern women, with Bree arguing that good women are always losing to the "hoes" and that men complain about women having fake body parts but still lust after those same women. Another topic of discussion is racism against black people, which Raja disagrees with on the basis that the country has a black president, to which Rashad counters that Obama has done nothing when recent cases involving murdered black youths have been all over the media. Still, Raja insists that there has never been a better time to be a black person.

Calvin has recently been talking to a smooth-talking businessman called One-Stop (JB Smoove) about taking the barbershop business from the south side to the north side to avoid the dangers in the streets. Only Calvin's wife Jennifer (Jazsmin Lewis) is aware of this, and she's only considering for Jalen's sake.

A regular client, Jay (Renell Gibbs), enters to be taken care of by Draya, but another man, Marquis (Jamal Woolard), shows up, clearly having beef with Jay. The two men nearly fight in the shop as it is revealed they are both "shot callers" from rival gangs, until Calvin and Rashad intervene.

Jalen and Kenny get in trouble at school after being involved in a fight with the gang from earlier that morning. Jalen is unharmed but Kenny has a bruise under his eye. This pushes Calvin to consider putting his son in Catholic school, and also makes him trust Kenny even less, to the point where he confronts Rashad and tells him their sons shouldn't be hanging out so much. It gets more serious when Jennifer goes through her son's drawers and finds gang paraphernalia.

With all the trouble going on in the neighborhood, Jimmy stops by and announces an enclosure with heavy police presence. The members of the shop band together to organize a forum that night with the community to set up a ceasefire, along with free haircuts to anyone that passes by.

Outside the shop, Terri becomes suspicious of Draya for being flirty and close to Rashad. He offers to take Draya home one evening on his way to pick up his daughter. Draya invites Rashad up to her apartment to talk but Rashad knows what's up, even if she denies it being sexual and declines her offer.

The barbershop team set up for Jay and Marquis to arrive at the same time so they can get involved in the ceasefire. After a bit of tension and another near-altercation, both men agree to the ceasefire out of respect for Calvin. Over the weekend, the ceasefire commences. Jerrod and Raja put the word out on Twitter for people to come to the barbershop. A large number of people show up, and things appear to be going smoothly.

While at the barbershop, Rashad goes in the supply room in the back of the shop to grab some items, and Draya goes to do the same. He apologizes for misinterpreting her motives from the other night. She forgives him but then tries to kiss him. Terri enters and heads into the back, looking for Rashad. She catches Rashad and Draya both hiding closet after he ignored her calling his name, leading her to believe they were hooking up. Terri attempts to fight Draya, chasing her to the front of the shop, however Calvin and others stop her. Terri then storms out and Rashad follows to try and explain himself, but she doesn't believe or trust him.

As the shop celebrates a day of peace, Officer Terrence (Timon Kyle Durett) stops by to announce the tragic news that Anthony was shot to death on his way home from the library. Understandably devastated, Calvin gives up on the ceasefire and loses hope that they can make a difference in the neighborhood. The tension leads to Rashad revealing Calvin's intentions (after overhearing his conversation on a phone call) of moving the shop to the north side get out, which upsets Angie the most since Calvin kept it from her.

Calvin storms out of the shop and goes to the bar, with Eddie joining him after. He tries to assure Calvin that although Anthony's death was a terrible loss, they still may have prevented even more lives from being taken. This inspires him to return to the shop and apologize, while also putting the ceasefire back on. Almost immediately, the shop gets a visit from Anthony Davis, which brings more attention to the shop.

By that evening, the shop sees even more business, including media coverage, as well as becoming a trending topic on Twitter. JD brings his food truck along and racks up some nice business as well, until his lies catch up to him and is guilt-tripped into giving up a substantial amount of his earnings to a real charity. Terri goes to the shop and sees Rashad. She apologizes for accusing him of adultery and they reconcile.

Kenny runs into the shop and tells Calvin that Jalen is at the park ready for a gang initiation (which Kenny had previously backed out of). Calvin rushes to the park as we see Jalen approaching Yummy over the initiation. When Calvin gets there, the gang has left, but Jalen decided to stay behind. Without a word, he joins his father.

In the morning, the ceasefire comes to an end, and the shop celebrates. Everyone starts to go home. Bree and Jerrod walk together, and they admit having feelings for each other, and they set up dinner for the next night. Draya later visits Terri and apologizes for coming onto Rashad, stating that she feels that Terri has her life figured out while Draya doesn't. Terri forgives her and Draya offers a proposition for the couple.

Jalen visits his dad at the shop and asks him to cut his hair for him. Calvin obliges and cuts off his dreads. The two reaffirm their love for each other, and then Calvin tells Jalen to sweep the floor. Calvin's closing words state that he still loves his city, and he never gave up on it, since it never gave up on him. He and Jalen join Jennifer, along with Rashad, Terri and the kids.

During the closing credits, the shop gets an unexpected visit from President Obama (Reggie Brown). Eddie volunteers to give the man a haircut after earlier claiming to have cut his hair years ago. Visibly nervous, Eddie messes up and accidentally shaves a good part on the back of Obama's head.

Cast

 Ice Cube as Calvin Palmer, Jr.
 Nicki Minaj as Draya
 Cedric the Entertainer as Eddie Walker 
 Regina Hall as Angie
 Sean Patrick Thomas as Jimmy James
 Jazsmin Lewis as Jennifer
 Eve as Terri
 Anthony Anderson as J.D.
 Common as Rashad
 Margot Bingham as Bree
 Utkarsh Ambudkar as Raja
 J. B. Smoove as One Stop
 Lamorne Morris as Jerrod
 Tyga as Yummy
 Jamal Woolard as Marquese
 Deon Cole as Dante
 Michael Rainey Jr. as Jalen Palmer
 Troy Garity as Isaac
 Anthony Davis as himself
 Reggie Brown as President Obama
 Jwaundace Candece as Boy's Mother
 Diallo Thompson as Kenny Smith 
 Auntie Fee as Mabel

Production
On March 26, 2014, Deadline Hollywood reported that MGM was in negotiations with Ice Cube to produce a third Barbershop film. On February 19, 2015, Malcolm D. Lee was set to direct the third film, while Ice Cube and Cedric the Entertainer were in talks to join the film. On March 25, 2015, New Line Cinema signed on with MGM to release the film, while MGM would handle the production. Principal photography began in Atlanta, Georgia on May 11, 2015. On November 14, 2015, director Malcolm D. Lee said in an interview at the 7th Annual Governors Award ceremony that the title of the film had been changed from Barbershop 3 to Barbershop: The Next Cut.

Release
The film was originally scheduled for release on February 19, 2016, but was pushed back to April 15, 2016.

Reception

Box office
In the United States and Canada, the film was released alongside The Jungle Book and Criminal, and was projected to gross $26–30 million from 2,661 theaters in its opening weekend. It made $7 million on its first day (including $735,000 from Thursday night previews) and went on to gross $20.2 million, finishing second at the box office behind The Jungle Book ($103.6 million).

The film went on to have a total worldwide gross of $55 million.

Critical response
On Rotten Tomatoes, the film has an approval rating of 90% based on 93 reviews, with an average rating of 6.84/10. The site's critical consensus reads, "Heartfelt, thought-provoking, and above all funny, Barbershop: The Next Cut is the rare belated sequel that more than lives up to the standard set by its predecessors." On Metacritic, the film has a weighted average score of 67 out of 100, based on 30 critics, indicating "generally favorable reviews". Audiences polled by CinemaScore gave the film an average grade of "A−" on an A+ to F scale, while PostTrak reported a 63% "definitely recommend".

Richard Roeper of the Chicago Sun-Times wrote: "It’s impressive how well director Malcolm D. Lee (working from a script by Kenya Barris and Tracy Oliver) balances the serious material with the bawdy, freewheeling comedy pieces."

Accolades

Soundtrack 

The soundtrack was released digitally by Atlantic Records on April 8, 2016, and consists of hip hop and R&B music.

Track listing

See also 
 List of hood films

References

External links
 
 
 
 

2016 films
2016 comedy films
African-American comedy films
American sequel films
Cultural depictions of Barack Obama
2010s English-language films
Films scored by Stanley Clarke
Films directed by Malcolm D. Lee
Films produced by Ice Cube
Films produced by Robert Teitel
Films set in Chicago
Films shot in Atlanta
Films with screenplays by Kenya Barris
Cube Vision films
Metro-Goldwyn-Mayer films
New Line Cinema films
Warner Bros. films
Barbershop (franchise)
2010s American films
African-American films